Sievi is a municipality of Finland.

It is located in the province of Oulu and is part of the North Ostrobothnia region. The municipality has a population of 
which 
is water. The population density is
.

The municipality is unilingually Finnish.

History 
The name of Sievi is derived from the word sievä, which in the local dialect means "smooth". The name was in reference to an esker on which the farm of Sievi(lä) was located. Said farm was first mentioned in 1547 and was owned by Olli Ollinpoika Hihna. Sievi was a part of the Kalajoki parish, under which it became a chapel community in 1645. The chapel community was also known as Evijärvi (not to be confused with the Southern Ostrobothnian Evijärvi) after another village in the area, which is nowadays known as Järvikylä. After becoming an independent parish and municipality in 1862, Sievi became the only official name for it.

References

External links

Municipality of Sievi – Official website

Municipalities of North Ostrobothnia
Populated places established in 1867